Svante Kohala (born 9 February 1998) is a Swedish luger who competes internationally.

He represented his country at the 2022 Winter Olympics.

His father, Hans, competed at the 1992 and 1994 Winter Olympics.

References

External links
 
 
 

1998 births
Living people
Swedish male lugers
Olympic lugers of Sweden
Lugers at the 2016 Winter Youth Olympics
Lugers at the 2022 Winter Olympics
Sportspeople from Stockholm